The Islamic State – Yemen Province (IS-YP) is a branch of the militant Islamist group Islamic State (IS), active in Yemen. IS announced the group's formation on 13 November 2014.

Organization
Yemen Province's organizational structure is divided into geographical based sub-units. There are at least eight known sub-provinces active in Yemen as of 2015, many named after existing administrative divisions of Yemen:

Wilayah Sana'a – around Yemen's capital of the same name
Wilayah Aden-Abyan – around the Aden Governorate
Wilayah Lahij – in the Lahij Governorate
Wilayah Green Brigade – in the southwestern governorates of Ibb and Taiz
Wilayah al-Bayda – in the central Al Bayda Governorate
Wilayah Shabwah – in the eastern Shabwah Governorate
Wilayah Ataq – around the city of Ataq
Wilayah Hadramawt – in the large eastern Hadhramaut Governorate

At least seven separate sub-wilayah have claimed responsibility for attacks in Yemen, including Wilayah Sana'a, Wilayah Lahij, and Wilayah al-Bayda.

By 2018 all Wilayats in Yemen were merged as a singular "Yemen Wilayah" similar to ISIL's merger of its Iraqi and Syrian provinces into singular provinces rather than several smaller ones.

In summer 2020 the Houthis cleared 1000km2 of terrain from AQAP and ISIS forces in their Al Bayda offensive. Abu Al-Walid Al-Adani, ISIS Emir in Qifah District was killed in this offensive. With that the largest known ISIS pocket in Yemen was eliminated.

Activities
On 13 November 2014, IS announced that a branch of the group had been established in Yemen, following pledges of allegiance made by unidentified militants in the country. al-Qaeda in the Arabian Peninsula (AQAP), the strongest militant group in the country, rejected this establishment. By December of that year, IS had begun to build an active presence inside Yemen, and its recruitment drive brought it into direct competition with AQAP. The branch's first attack occurred in March 2015, when it carried out suicide bombings on 2 Shia Mosques in the Yemeni capital. In the following months it continued to carry out attacks aimed largely at civilian targets associated with the Shia Houthi movement.

The group has been able to attract recruits by appealing to heightened sectarianism in the country following the outbreak of the Yemeni Civil War in 2015. It has received a number of defectors from al-Qaeda in the Arabian Peninsula, who are drawn by the group's money and its ability to carry out regular attacks against the Houthis. This has led to increased tensions with AQAP, although the two sides had avoided clashes as of late 2015.

On 6 October 2015, IS militants conducted a series of suicide bombings in Aden that killed 15 soldiers affiliated with the Hadi government and the Saudi-led coalition. The attacks were directed against the al-Qasr hotel, which had been a headquarters for pro-Hadi officials, and also military facilities. The group carried out further attacks against pro-Hadi forces, including the December 2015 assassination of Aden's governor. The group experienced a major split in the same month, when dozens of its members, including military and religious leaders, publicly rejected ISIL's leader in Yemen for perceived violations of Sharia. ISIL's central command condemned the dissenters, accusing them of violating their pledge to al-Baghdadi. A member of AQAP claimed in early 2016 that about 30 members of IS in Yemen had recently defected to his organisation, unhappy with the group's tactics and targeting of mosques and Muslim civilians.

On 15 May 2016, IS militants claimed responsibility for a suicide attack that killed 25 police recruits in the city of Mukalla in southern Yemen. AQAP was forced out of the city in April by the Saudi-led coalition.

On 30 August 2019, IS claimed responsibility for a suicide attack that killed 3 soldiers of security belt forces.

In October 2020 IS spokesman Abu Hamza al-Qurashi offered condolences to the organization's Yemen branch confirming end of IS territorial control in the country.

Leadership
The first known leader of IS-YP was Abu Bilal al-Harbi, who was identified by BuzzFeed News as the leader of IS-YP on 6 July 2015, although it's not clear if he was part of the group since its inception or joined at some later point. In March 2017, Yemeni national Muhammad Qan’an Al-Saya’ri (a.k.a. Abu Usama Al-Muhajir) became leader. On 25 June 2019, Al-Muhajir was captured by Saudi coalition forces.

Designation as a terrorist organization

References

Factions of the Islamic State of Iraq and the Levant
Jihadist groups
Organizations designated as terrorist by Iraq
Organizations designated as terrorist by the United States
Rebel groups in Yemen
Terrorism in Yemen